The MacCormaig Isles are small islands south of the Island of Danna in the Inner Hebrides of Scotland.

The MacCormaig Islands lie in the entrance to Loch Sween within the powerful tides of the Sound of Jura. They form part of the Ulva, Danna and the McCormaig (sic) Isles SSSI. Islands include:

 Carraig an Daimh
 Corr Eilean
 Eilean Ghamhna
 Liath Eilean
 Eilean Mòr
 Sgeir Bun an Locha
 Sgeir Dhonncha
 Dubh Sgeir

Eilean Mòr is owned by Scottish National Party. The 12th century chapel on it is dedicated to St Cormac (d.640).

The islands are a popular sea kayaking destination.

Gallery

See also

 List of islands of Scotland

Footnotes

External links

Islands of Argyll and Bute
Archipelagoes of Scotland